The Borzeşti II Power Station is a large thermal power plant located in Borzeşti, having 5 generation groups of 50 MW each having a total electricity generation capacity of 250 MW.

References

External links
Description 

Natural gas-fired power stations in Romania